OBE TV (Original Black Entertainment TV) was a British television channel launched in September 2003. It showed film, food, advertisements, sports and talk shows as well as conservative Christian programmes. The channel was aimed at African audiences and showed programmes from South Africa, Nigeria and Ghana. Its programmes were primarily taken from the South African Broadcasting Corporation, including the SABC's news broadcasts.

A timeshifted service named OBE +1 launched on Thursday 29 November 2007 and it was replaced by DMAX on 8 January 2008 while the linear channel closed down permanently in 2011.

Programming
Miracle Power - with Pastor Kingsley Appiagyei
Bruce's Kitchen
Home Sweet Home
Taxi Driver
London Got Problem
Centre 4
Paridigams
Driss's Kitchen
Hotel St. James
I Stand Accused
Tentacles
Music Africa - a slot that shows music videos from West African artists
Reggae Showcase - interviews, discussions and performances hosted by the artist Named Savana
Saga Africa
Superbook
I am a Four Door Saloon
Super Story
Dada Boat
This Life
Papa Ajasco
Fresh Act
Nollywood
Black Variety Show
Africa Within
Gimme My Moonay Back
Straight Talk (hosted By Papa Aikins)
London Get Problem
Mmaa Nkomo
Dustbina Okebagou
Mzansi Jams- Top Hit Southern African Music Show Produced by Oscar 'Oskido' Mdlongwa, Sanpoulus Maplanka, and Atterbell Maplanka
Love and Politics
Half Sisters
Special Assignment
KICC
BO Chicken Eaters
Sports With Kwaku
World Music - a broadcasting slot that ranges from one up to four hours, featuring music videos by an assortment of African artists
Shaka Zulu - a series produced in South Africa in 1986, focusing on the Zulu king Shaka
Teleshopping - broadcast in slots that range from 30 minutes to two hours at midnight
OBE TV Noticeboard  - Info About funerals and Events
Hip Life - Entertainment and Music

References

External links
 

Television channels and stations established in 2003
Television channels in the United Kingdom
Defunct television channels in the United Kingdom
Television channels and stations disestablished in 2011
Black British culture